Visions is a 90-minute American television weekly anthology series that aired from 1976 to 1978. It was produced by KCET in Los Angeles and televised nationally on PBS. It concentrated on the works of mostly new and some prominent writers, including Cormac McCarthy, Marsha Norman, Jean Shepherd, Luis Valdez, and Robert M. Young. Each episode was written by a different writer and starred a different cast.

Among its stars were Tyne Daly, Charles Durning, Brad Dourif, Morgan Freeman, Carol Kane, and Judd Hirsch.  Its directors included Maya Angelou, Richard Pearce, Michael Lindsay-Hogg, Paul Bogart, and Gordon Davidson.

Episodes included The War Widow and El Corrido.

It won one prime-time Emmy Award and was nominated for two others.

References

External links
 
Visions at CVTA with list of episodes

Primetime Emmy Award winners
1976 American television series debuts
1980 American television series endings
1970s American anthology television series
1980s American anthology television series
PBS original programming